Qatar Gaz (also Romanized as Qaţār Gaz; also known as Rādgaz) is a village in Fasharud Rural District, in the Central District of Birjand County, South Khorasan Province, Iran. At the 2006 census, its population was 70, in 23 families.

References 

Populated places in Birjand County